The Given Note is the fourth solo album by master uilleann piper and prominent Irish traditional musician Liam O'Flynn. Produced by Shaun Davey and recorded at Windmill Lane Studios in Dublin, the album was released in 1995. The title was suggested by O'Flynn's good friend Seamus Heaney, winner of the 1995 Nobel Prize for Literature. Heaney also wrote a tribute to O'Flynn which is on the sleeve notes of the album.

Critical response

In his review for Allmusic, Chris Nickson gave the album three out of five stars, calling it "an object lesson in the way [Celtic] music should be played in the 1990s". Nickson observes that despite O'Flynn covering the full Celtic music spectrum, it is the Irish songs that "lie closest to O'Flynn's heart". Nickson concludes:

Track listing
 "O'Farrell's Welcome to Limerick" – 4:07
 "O'Rourke's, the Merry Sisters, Colonel Fraser" – 3:36
 "Come With Me over the Mountain, a Smile in the Dark" – 4:34
 "Farewell to Govan" – 4:00
 "Joyce's Tune" – 4:41
 "The Green Island, Spellan the Fiddler" – 3:50
 "Foliada de Elviña" – 4:06
 "Ag Taisteal Na Blárnan (Travelling Through Blarney)" – 4:10
 "The Rambler, the Aherlow Jig" – 3:26
 "The Smith's a Gallant Fireman" – 3:02
 "Romeo's Exile" – 3:52
 "The Rocks of Bawn" – 6:07
 "Cailín na Gruaige Doinne (The Girl of the Brown Hair)" – 3:53
 "Teño un Amor Na Montaña, Alborada - Unha Noite no Santo Cristo" – 9:22

Personnel
 Liam O'Flynn – uilleann pipes, whistle
 Arty McGlynn – guitar
 Steve Cooney – guitar, bass guitar, didgeridoo
 Rod McVey – synthesizers, Hammond organ, harmonium
 Noel Eccles – percussion
 Sean Keane – fiddle
 Rodrigo Romani (Milladoiro) – harp
 Xose V. Ferreirós (Milladoiro) – Galician gaita, tambourine, oboe
 Nando Casal (Milladoiro) – Galician gaita, clarinet
 Ciaran Mordaunt – side drums (track 10)
 Andy Irvine – vocals, mandolin
 Paul Brady – vocals, mandolin, piano

References

External links
 Record Label Catalogue 2009
 Album Sleevenotes

1995 albums
Liam O'Flynn albums